Anolis pinchoti, also known commonly as the Crab Cay anole, is a species of lizard in the family Dactyloidae. The species is endemic to Colombia.

Etymology
The specific name, pinchoti, is in honor of American forester Gifford Pinchot.

Geographic range
A. pinchoti is found on three Caribbean islands belonging to Colombia: Crab Cay, Providencia Island, and Santa Catalina Island.

Habitat
The preferred natural habitats of A. pinchoti are forest and shrubland, but it has also been found in banana plantations.

Reproduction
A. pinchoti is oviparous.

References

Further reading
Calderón-Espinosa ML, Barragán Forero A (2011). "Morphological Diversification in Solitary Endemic Anoles: Anolis concolor and Anolis pinchoti from San Andrés and Providence Islands, Colombia". South American Journal of Herpetology 6 (3): 205–210.
Cochran DM (1931). "A new lizard (Anolis pinchoti) from Old Providence Island". Journal of the Washington Academy of Sciences 21: 354–355. (Anolis pinchoti, new species).
Nicholson KE (2002). "Phylogenetic analysis and a test of the current infrageneric classification of Norops (beta Anolis)". Herpetological Monographs 16: 93–120. (Norops pinchoti, new combination).
Schwartz A, Henderson RW (1991). Amphibians and Reptiles of the West Indies: Descriptions, Distributions, and Natural History. Gainesville: University of Florida Press. 720 pp. . (Anolis pinchoti, p. 314).
Schwartz A, Thomas R (1975). A Check-list of West Indian Amphibians and Reptiles. Carnegie Museum of Natural History Special Publication No. 1. Pittsburgh, Pennsylvania: Carnegie Museum of Natural History. 216 pp. (Anolis pinchoti, p. 97).

Anoles
Reptiles described in 1931
Endemic fauna of Colombia
Reptiles of Colombia
Taxa named by Doris Mable Cochran